Rainier Joseph Diaz Castillo, better known simply as Rainier Castillo (born October 21, 1985), is a Filipino actor, singer, model, and dancer. His father lives in Winnipeg, Manitoba, Canada. He is known for his "killer smile" and one-trick pony of identified with his F4 hairstyle of Jerry Yan. He made it as one of the Final Four in the first season of StarStruck, though he eventually lost the title of Ultimate StarStruck Male Survivor to Mark Herras. He is a former star of GMA Network, now a Kapatid of TV5 then in 2014, Castillo went back to Kapuso Network.

Biography/career
A freshman from AMA Computer University, he joined the reality-based artista search "StarStruck" and was linked over four female survivors during the competition: Jade Lopez, Yasmien Kurdi, Jennylyn Mercado and Sheena Halili. He was linked with Jade Lopez because during the competition Lopez had a crush on him, he was linked with Sheena Halili and was his love team on the competition but when Halili got eliminated their love team had stopped after the contest they continued to have a relationship but later called it off.

Though he lost in the competition, StarStruck was his turning point for his career. This was considered the biggest thing happened to his life that provided door for more opportunities. He is visible in shows of the station such as teen-oriented shows like Click and Joyride, fantaseryes like Mulawin, Majika, Kamandag, Fantastic Man and Tasya Fantasya, comedy shows like Hokus Pokus and drama series like Maynila, Love to Love and Bakekang.

In 2010, he transferred to TV5 and signed a two-year non-exclusive contract with the network and was managed by Noel Ferrer (the manager of Ryan Agoncillo and many others).

Endorsements
Rainier has a few commercials to his credit, like Hapee Toothpaste (one commercial as an individual and another with Angel Locsin). He was also a model for Bench FIX Salon and he took part in Bench's 2004 Understatement underwear fashion show held at the Araneta Coliseum. In December 2005, he also appeared in a Sunsilk Touch Flicks short film with his then-on-screen partner Yasmien Kurdi.

Filmography

Television shows

Films

Discography
 I Love You Babe

Award
 2004 PMPC Star Awards for TV "Best Male New TV Personality" from his show "Click"

References

External links
 Rainier Castillo at PogiSpotting
 
 Rainier Castillo Message Board

1985 births
Filipino male child actors
Filipino child singers
21st-century Filipino male singers
Filipino male television actors
Filipino male voice actors
Filipino male film actors
Living people
People from Quezon City
Male actors from Metro Manila
Participants in Philippine reality television series
StarStruck (Philippine TV series) participants
GMA Network personalities
TV5 (Philippine TV network) personalities
Viva Artists Agency